The 110th Grey Cup will be played to decide the Canadian Football League (CFL) championship for the 2023 season. The game is scheduled to be played on November 19, 2023, at Tim Hortons Field in Hamilton, Ontario. It will be the 12th time that Hamilton has hosted the Grey Cup, with the most recent being in 2021.

Host
Due to Ontario COVID-19 public health orders still in effect as of mid-October 2021, all in-person entertainment festivities for the 108th Grey Cup in Hamilton were cancelled. It was therefore announced on October 14, 2021, that the 110th Grey Cup in 2023 would be awarded to Hamilton, in order to allow organizers to host the Grey Cup and all associated festivities as originally planned.

Date
As per the latest Collective Bargaining Agreement signed in 2022, the league had the option of moving the start of the 2023 season up to 30 days, which could have significantly altered the date of this game. However, the league chose to continue with the existing scheduling formula and the Hamilton Tiger-Cats confirmed that the game would be played on November 19, 2023 (the third Sunday of November).

References

Grey Cup
Grey Cups hosted in Hamilton, Ontario
Grey Cup
Grey Cup
Grey
2023 in Canadian television
2023 in Ontario